West Lavington is a village and civil parish on the edge of Midhurst in the Chichester district of West Sussex, England.  It contains a small private nursery school and the (now deconsecrated) church of St Mary Magdalene.

The church was constructed for Henry Edward Manning who was at the time rector of Woolavington, now East Lavington, with West Lavington forming a detached portion of that parish until 1851.  The churchyard contains the grave of Richard Cobden although he lived in the neighbouring parish of Heyshott.

In the 2001 census there were 111 households with a total population of 298 of whom 115 were economically active. At the 2011 Census the population of the civil parish was 276.

As a result of falling congregations and the church's poor condition, St Mary Magdalene church was closed in September 2008 and the congregation transferred to neighbouring Cocking. The two parishes were subsequently united and are now known as "The Parish of Cocking with West Lavington". In 2013, the former church at West Lavington was offered for sale, although the graveyard will continue to belong to the parish with public access.

References

External links

Villages in West Sussex
Chichester District